Omnicron may refer to:

Arts and entertainment
 Omnicron, a musical project by Justin Lassen
 "Omnicron", a single by the hip-hop group Jedi Mind Tricks from the album The Psycho-Social, Chemical, Biological & Electro-Magnetic Manipulation of Human Consciousness
 Omnicron Conspiracy, a computer video game

Fictional entities
 Omnicron, a class of robot sniper characters in the miniature figure board wargame Heroscape
 Omnicron, a planet of the fictional cyborg character Combatron from the Filipino comic series Funny Komiks

Companies
 Omnicron Electronics, developers of the TCC-14 Talking Clock/Calendar
 Omnicron Records, a music label in Barbourmeade, Kentucky, US

See also

 Starbeams: The Omnicron Ray, an episode of the English language dub collection Robo Formers taken from the Japanese anime television series Getter Robo G
 OmnicronPsy, a fictional supercomputer in the donghau television series Zentrix
 SARS-CoV-2 Omicron variant (mispronounced "Omnicron"), a variant of the virus that causes COVID-19
 Omicron (disambiguation)
 Omnicons, in the Transformers: Energon anime television series